Here Come the Tigers is a 1978 American sports comedy film directed by Sean S. Cunningham.

Plot
"A wild team of misfits think that they can make it big. What's a coach to do with a chronic nose-picker, a flatulent fielder, an out of control pitcher, a juvenile delinquent and the prettiest girl in the state? Turn this bunch of losers into a winning team! When their new coach enlists an unusual new teammate, it's a whole new ballgame as they band together to win their first championship, determined to prove that losers can be winners, too."

Cast
 Richard Lincoln – Eddie Burke
 James Zvanut – Burt Honneger
 Samantha Grey – Bette Burke
 Manny Lieberman – Felix the Umpire
 William Caldwell – Kreeger
 Fred Lincoln – Aesop
 Xavier Rodrigo – Buster
 Sean Patrick Griffin – Art "The Fart" Bullfinch

Production
Cunningham said in Crystal Lake Memories: The Complete History of Friday the 13th (2005) he believed that the film cost $250,000 to make, "if that. It could be much lower. It was guerrilla filmmaking. It was all kids from the little leagues; it was like being on a three-week field trip with a bunch of sixth-graders. It was good and bad, frustrating and exciting. I loved it."

Victor Miller, who wrote the film under the pseudonym Arch McCoy, said: "Those were the days when everybody said, 'What America needs is a good G-rated movie.' I guess Here Come the Tigers made its money back, but they lied about America wanting G-rated films."

Reception
Variety called it a ripoff of The Bad News Bears (1976), trying to cash in on the success of the original and its sequel, with dull direction and dreadful acting.

References

External links

1978 films
1970s sports comedy films
American sports comedy films
American baseball films
Fictional sports teams
American International Pictures films
Films scored by Harry Manfredini
Films directed by Sean S. Cunningham
Films shot in Connecticut
Films with screenplays by Victor Miller (writer)
1978 comedy films
1970s English-language films
1970s American films